Goniodoris petiti is a species of sea slug, a dorid nudibranch, a marine gastropod mollusc in the family Goniodorididae.

References

gastropods described in 1875
Goniodorididae